Gran Vía is a station on Line 1 and Line 5 of the Madrid Metro, located underneath Gran Vía and Red de San Luis Plaza in the Centro district of Madrid. It is located in fare zone A.

History 
The station was opened in 1919 as one of the original 8 metro stops in Madrid. The original name of the station was Red de San Luis after the nearby plaza. The Gran Vía street was still under construction at that time, but a year later the station adopted that name.

During the dictatorship of Franco, the name was changed again to José Antonio. This was done in parallel with the renaming of the Gran Vía street to José Antonio Avenue by Franco, in honor of José Antonio, founder of the fascist party Falange.

In 1970, the Line 5 platforms opened under the name José Antonio. Fourteen years later, in 1984, the station returned to its previous name of Gran Vía.

For many years, the station was known for  that housed the elevators, built by the architect Antonio Palacios. It was constructed of polished granite with an iron and glass canopy. To use the elevator, customers had to pay a small fee. The original vestibule, also done by Palacios, was decorated with glazed tiles. When the edifice was dismantled in 1972, it was returned to O Porriño, the architect's hometown. A replica of this structure has since been installed in the station. Subsequently, with the comprehensive reform of 2018, the project to install a replica of it in its original location was carried out. During the works, the original remains of said temple appeared, specifically the elevator shaft, located at the end of Calle Montera and Gran Vía.

Since July 3, 2016, the platforms of Line 1 of the station have been closed due to works to improve the facilities on the line between the stations of Plaza de Castilla and Sierra de Guadalupe. The completion of the works It was scheduled for November 12, 2016, with the station platforms reopening on November 13, when the work was completed and service was restored on the last section of Line 1 to open, between the Cuatro Caminos and Atocha Renfe stations.​ In this section, the actions carried out were: the waterproofing and consolidation of the tunnel, the oldest in the Madrid underground, which was reinforced by means of cement injections and special concrete projections with metal support meshes, and the installation of the rigid catenary, as well as the assembly of the rest of the facilities and services. Since July 2017, Line 5 has been closed and reopened in September.

Renovation works (2018–2021) 
From 2018 to 2021, the station underwent major renovations and physical expansions, which included the construction of a pedestrian tunnel to the nearby Sol station, at an estimated cost of €18 million. Following a number of significant delays, the station was finally reopened to the public on 16 July 2021. The delay was caused by the finding of the remains of the Palacios elevator and stairs and a collapse risk of the tunnel to the commuter railway station.

Originally, the completion date of the works was scheduled for April 2019, but later it was delayed to mid-October, the first quarter of 2020, March 2020 and "late 2020 or early 2021 ». The COVID-19 crisis postponed the progress of the works and the reopening date. On November 16, 2020, the Community of Madrid announced that the reform works could end in the summer of 2021, limiting, after an announcement on April 7, 2021, to the month of July. On June 3, the final date for the opening of the station was announced, July 16, 2021.

Further reading 
 Zozaya, María; Barrena, Clemente y Medrano, José Miguel, La Gran Vía, Real Academia de Bellas Artes de San Fernando, 2002, Madrid..

References

External links 

 Station information page on the Madrid Metro web site

Line 1 (Madrid Metro) stations
Line 5 (Madrid Metro) stations
Gran Vía (Madrid)
Railway stations in Spain opened in 1919